Mario Peña may refer to:
Mario Peña (basketball) (born 1940), Mexican basketball player
Mario Fernando Peña Angulo (1952–2008), Peruvian politician
Mario Alberto Peña (1980–2013), American-Mexican drug lord